Pseudophilautus halyi, known as pattipola shrub frog, is an extinct species of frog in the family Rhacophoridae. It was endemic to Sri Lanka. It is only known from the holotype collected in 1899 (or before). The specific name halyi honours Amyrald Haly, the first director of the Ceylon Museum, author of the "Natural History of Ceylon", and the collector of the holotype.

Description
The body is stout. The snout is bluntly angled dorsally and rounded in profile. The tympanum is visible, and the supratympanic fold is prominent. The canthal edges are sharp. Skin is granular or shagreened with glandular warts. The fingers have dermal fringes whereas the toes are medially webbed. The upper parts of the alcohol-preserved specimen are uniformly brown and the underside is pale yellowish brown.

Distribution and conservation
No other specimens are known, despite extensive field surveys in modern times. The habitat requirements of this species are unknown. The reasons for its demise are also unknown, but probably involved habitat loss.

References

halyi
Endemic fauna of Sri Lanka
Frogs of Sri Lanka
Amphibian extinctions since 1500
Taxa named by George Albert Boulenger
Amphibians described in 1904
Taxonomy articles created by Polbot